Enrico Cardile (born 5 April 1975) is an Italian aerodynamicist working for Scuderia Ferrari, where he takes charge of the Aerodynamics Department and works as the vehicle project manager.

Career
Cardile obtained a degree in aerospace engineering at the University of Pisa in 2002. He spent a further three years at the university collaborating with Ferrari on an aerodynamic innovation project.
In 2005, he joined Ferrari on FIA GT Championship-related projects]], overseeing aerodynamics. In 2016, he moved across to the Formula One team, working as Head of Aero Development, and was appointed as vehicle project manager in the following year.

References

1975 births
Living people
Ferrari people
Formula One designers
Italian automotive engineers
Italian motorsport people
People from Arezzo
University of Pisa alumni